The Beijing Museum of Natural History (BMNH) is located at 126 Tian Qiao Nan Street, Dongcheng District, Beijing, 100050, and is the most popular natural history museum in China. It was founded in 1951 as the National Central Museum of Natural History, and its name was changed to the Beijing Museum of Natural History in 1962. The BMNH is the first large scale natural history museum created in China.

The BMNH has total floor space of 24,000 square meters, of which 8,000 square meters are available for display and owns more than 200,000 specimens. The major display area is the Tian Jiabing Building. The collections include paleontology, ornithology, mammals and invertebrates, and include a major collection of dinosaur fossils and mounted skeletons. The BMNH also engages in significant scientific research in these areas.

Major specimens and exhibitions

Fossil Galleries 
There are three galleries devoted to paleontology in the museum. In the Mesozoic gallery, a large bronze model of the ancient earth is set at the beginning of the gallery. In the center of the gallery, a large Mamenchisaurus skeleton is mounted, with multiple dromaeosaur skeletons darting around it. A Szechuanosaurus is also mounted in an upright stance. Also, skeletal mounts of both Bactrosaurus and Lufengosaurus are featured. In the back of the gallery, a Yangchuanosaurus is mounted attacking a Tuojiangosaurus. The gallery also features many feathered dinosaurs from Liaoning, including specimens of Confuciusornis, Microraptor, and Anchiornis. The gallery connects to a large exhibit with animatronic dinosaurs and a smaller gallery housing dinosaur eggs.

The Cenozoic gallery has multiple mounts of Paraceratherium, Stegodon, and Megaloceros. Also on display is a skull of a woolly mammoth. In a glass case, a skeleton of an entelodont is featured. Also on display are skulls of several prehistoric mammals, including Homotherium, Megaloceros, and Elasmotherium.

There is also a gallery showcasing early life on earth. There is a large sculpture showing an Anomalocaris, along with trilobites and a Hallucigenia bursting out of the floor. There is a display of ammonites arranged in a helix shell. There are also many fossils from the Cambrian explosion.

Gallery

See also 
 List of museums in China
 List of natural history museums

References

External links

Official website

Museums established in 1951
Museums in Beijing
Natural history museums in China
1951 establishments in China
National first-grade museums of China